Delhi Ridge, sometimes simply called The Ridge, is a ridge in the Northern Aravalli leopard wildlife corridor in the National Capital Territory of Delhi in India. It is a northern extension of the ancient Aravalli Range, some 1.5 billion years old (by comparison, the Himalayas are "only" 50 million years old). The ridge consists of quartzite rocks and extends from the southeast at Tughlaqabad, near the Bhatti mines, branching out in places and tapering off in the north near Wazirabad on the west bank of the river Yamuna, covering about 35 kilometres.

The Ridge acts as the "green lungs" for the city, and protects Delhi from the hot winds of the deserts of Rajasthan to the west. It has also enabled Delhi to be the world's second most bird-rich capital city, after Kenya's Nairobi.

Though modest in height, the ridge acts as a watershed dividing the Indus Plain to the west from the Gangetic Plain to the east, within the Indo-Gangetic plain.

History
It is believed that the Aravallis are one of the oldest mountain ranges in India which evolved around 2.5 billion years ago in the Archaeozoic times. Range extends from Gujarat through Rajasthan to Haryana-Delhi. In Delhi the spurs of the Aravallis are commonly called as the Delhi Ridge which is divided into the Northern, Central, South Central and Southern Ridge.

In 1993, parts of north Delhi, central Delhi, south West Delhi and south Delhi covering 7,777 hectares was declared a reserve forest. Thereafter in 1994 and 1996, a major part of the ridge was notified by the Government, thus stopping all construction.

Over the years, pressures of urban development, have seen forests of Delhi ridge under threat. In many areas, landscaped public parks, and public housing have come up, plus the area also faces dumping of construction waste.

Geographical segments
The Ridge today, for administrative reasons, is divided into 4 separate zones, namely:

 The Old Delhi or Northern Ridge denotes the hilly area near Delhi University and is by far the smallest segment of the Ridge. Northern Ridge location is 28°40′52″N 77°12′57″E. Nearly 170 hectares were declared a Reserved Forest in 1915. Less than 87 hectares remain today near Delhi University, which is being developed as the Northern ridge biodiversity park by the Delhi Development Authority.
 The New Delhi or Central Ridge was made into a Reserved Forest in 1914 and stretches from just south of Sadar Bazaar to Dhaula Kuan. It extends over 864 hectares, but some bits have been nibbled away.
 The Mehrauli or South-Central Ridge is centred on "Sanjay Vana", near JNU and Vasant Kunj, and encompasses 633 hectares. Large chunks have been encroached and built upon. 70 hectares approximately near Sainik Farm are being developed as the Tilpath Valley Biodiversity Park. 
 The Tughlaqabad or Southern Ridge sprawls across 6200 hectares and includes the Asola Bhatti Wildlife Sanctuary. This is the least urban of the 4 segments of the Ridge, but a lot of it is village-owned or privately owned farmland. This includes Bandhwari and Mangar Bani forests.

Northern ridge
The Northern ridge biodiversity park, 87 hectares near Delhi University, is being developed by the Delhi Development Authority.

Historical monuments
The North Ridge, a part known as Kamala Nehru forest, is home to several historical monuments, including the Flag Staff Tower, built in 1828.

Central ridge
Central ridge includes 864 hectares which were made into a Reserved Forest in 1914 and stretches from just south of Sadar Bazaar to Dhaula Kuan.

Buddha Jayanti Park 

The Buddha Jayanti Smarak Park is situated in the central part of the Delhi ridge in New Delhi, India. It occupies a stretch of almost a kilometre on the eastern side of Vandemataram Marg, also known as Upper Ridge Road. It was created on the occasion of the 2500th anniversary of Gautama Buddha's enlightenment by Indian architect M. M. Rana. A sapling of the Bodhi Tree from Sri Lanka was planted here by the then Prime Minister of India Shri. Lal Bahadur Shastri on 25 October 1964.

On an artificial island in the park stands pavilion with a gilded Buddha statue in it. It was dedicated by the 14th Dalai Lama in October 1993. Each year in May on Vaisakha Full moon day the Buddha Jayanti festival is celebrated here.

South-Central Ridge
South-Central Ridge is encompasses 633 hectares. Large chunks have been encroached and built upon.

Aravalli Biodiversity Park

The area is confined by JNU, Mehrauli-Mahipalpur road, NH-8, Vasant Kunj, Masoodpur, Palam road and the southern boundary of Vasant Vihar. DDA and DU, under the joint Biodiversity Parks Programme, maintain the area. Every year a substantial amount of money is spent in restoration, development and maintenance.

The land under Aravalli Biodiversity Park was once a site for mining. Martha Shinde (Scindias) had a mining lease for the  area. They plundered out whatever they could. For years Shinde exploited forest resources including minerals, mica, sand, stone, rocks and water. Land, which once was covered with a dense forest, soon turned into pits and hillocks.

Scientists from the Centre for Environmental Management of Degraded Ecosystems (CEMDE) of University of Delhi have so far reintroduced over 10 ecosystems with over 40 biotic communities. Portions of Aravalli, which come under Gujarat, are covered with natural dense forest. However, the land on which Aravalli Biodiversity Park is being developed, was devoid of such natural growth of forest due to extensive mining of the area. The CEMDE and DDA are reviving native flora and fauna of Aravalli hill ranges by planting of native species, such as dhau (Anogeissus pendula), dhak (Butea monosperma), babul (Acacia nilotica) and kair (Capparis decidua). A rangeland with native grasses has been developed and a systematic planting program is carried out and every year native trees and bushes are planted to remove unwanted weeds, i.e. Prosopis juliflora. 
A conservatory of butterflies, orchidarium and fernery has been developed.

The Aravali Biodiversity Park, Gurgaon, on Gurgaon-Delhi border, developed by the Municipal Corporation of Gurgaon, was inaugurated on 5 June 2010, World Environment Day.

Neela Hauz Biodiversity Park

Neela Hauz biodiversity park, next to Sanjay Van in South Central Ridge, was restored in 2015-16. In 2014, of the 611 water bodies in Delhi, 274 were dead and remaining were in bad shape. Neela hauz is a freshwater lake which was slowly dying due to the dumping of waste. During ancient times it used to be the main source of water supply for the Rajput city of Qila Rai Pithora. During ancient times, its basin was recharged by the wider dense forests of Sanjay Van and its overflow drained in to Yamuna.

In 2014, the wetland was covered with water hyacinth and ridge was infested with the invasive species of prosopis juliflora (Vilayati Babul or Kikar of Mexican origin), which were planted in the 1920s by the Britisher colonisers to rehabilitate the wasteland. The silted up lake was encroached upon and raw sewage drained into it, causing concerned citizens to take an order from Delhi High Court to have it restored by the government. After the restoration started in 2015, this biodiversity park was officially inaugurated in November 2016.

Sanjay Van

Sanjay Van is located near JNU and Vasant Kunj.

Southern Ridge
Southern Ridge sprawls across 6200 hectares and includes the Asola Bhatti Wildlife Sanctuary, Bandhwari and Mangar Bani forests. This is the least urban of the 4 segments of the Ridge, but a lot of it is village-owned or privately owned farmland.

Asola Bhatti Wildlife Sanctuary 

Asola Bhatti Wildlife Sanctuary is a  32.71 km2 biodiversity area in the South Ridge on Delhi-Haryana border lies south of Delhi. It is an important habitat for the Indian leopard. Endangered species in the sanctuary include red-headed vulture and egyptian vulture, and the Government of Haryana has a vulture conservation program in place. Near-threatened species include painted stork, white-faced ibis and european roller. Rare birds include black francolin and grey-headed fish eagle. Plant species include butea monosperma (dhak or flame of forest), anogeissus (dhok), Wrightia tinctoria (inderjao), Indian elm, neolamarckia cadamba (kadamba), prosopis cineraria (jaand), tinospora cordifolia (giloi), etc.

Mangar Bani forest

Mangar Bani, neolithic archaeological site and sacred grove hill forest on Delhi-Haryana border, is in the South Delhi Ridge of Aravalli mountain range in Faridabad tehsil of Faridabad district in the Indian state of Haryana.

It lies within the Northern Aravalli leopard wildlife corridor stretching from Sariska Tiger Reserve to Delhi. Historical place around sanctuary are Badkhal Lake (6 km northeast), 10th century ancient Surajkund reservoir (15 km north) and Anangpur Dam (16 km north), Damdama Lake, Tughlaqabad Fort and Adilabad ruins (both in Delhi), Chhatarpur Temple (in Delhi). It is contiguous to the seasonal waterfalls in Pali-Dhuaj-Kot villages of Faridabad, and the Asola Bhatti Wildlife Sanctuary. It is also an important wetland for the migratory birds as there are several dozen lakes formed in the abandoned open pit mines in and around the area.

Spread over 5000 ha, this is the largest pre-historic site and stone age tool making factory in the Indian subcontinent, first ever site discovered in the Aravalli range with cave paintings. The stone tools and rock art dating back to 100,000 years BP and cave paintings date back to  20,000-40,000 BP. This is also the oldest human habitation discovered in Haryana and Delhi NCR.

Tilpath Valley Biodiversity Park

Tilpath Valley Biodiversity Park, spread over 172 acres is a biodiversity area in the South Ridge, immediately northwest of Asola Bhatti Wildlife Sanctuary and south of Sainik Farm. Before the area had valleys dotted with the sand-mined quarries, dried up springs due to no charging of ground water, with no forest cover except the invasive weed species of prosopis juliflora, lantana and parthenium. This was replaced with 3 layer of forest community with native trees and plants such as mahua, haldu, sheesham and bael. Scrubland was restored to attract reptiles and birds. 100,000 trees were planted in 2015 with the effort of 40,000 volunteers in 6 hours and 20,000 trees in 2016 again. Wildlife survey is conducted using pugmarks are tracking using pug impression pad and by photographing the wild animals. It now covers grasslands, hilly terrain,  105 plant species, 103 bird species, 32 butterflies species, 15 herpetofauna (reptiles and amphibians) species and eight mammalian species including leopard, Indian rock python, jackals, neelgai, mongooses, porcupines, small Indian civet, gecko, Sirkeer malkoha cuckoo, nightjar, Indian paradise flycatcher.

Being developed since 2015, it was officially inaugurated as Delhi's third biodiversity park on 3 February 2018.

See also
 National Parks & Wildlife Sanctuaries of Haryana
 Wildlife of India
 Wildlife sanctuaries of India
 Talkatora Gardens

References
Citations

Bibliography
 

External links

 Aravalli Biodiversity Park, Gurgaon, website
 Foundation of  biodiversity park laid
 Thorny British tree to be thrown out of biodiversity park
 ARAVALLI BIODIVERSITY PARK

Landforms of Delhi
Ridges of India
Aravalli Range
Tourist attractions in Delhi
Wildlife sanctuaries in Delhi
Wildlife sanctuaries in Haryana
South Delhi district
Gurgaon district
Faridabad district